European Championship 1992 is a football videogame produced by Tecmo and distributed by Elite in 1992. It was developed for Amiga, Atari ST and DOS.

This is a conversion of the coin-operated arcade video game World Cup '90 from Tecmo.
Game features include: tackling, short passes, long passes, volleys, headers, power headers, intercepting headers, free kicks, throw-ins, corners, goal kicks, one or two players, action re-play, save goal, save game, red and yellow cards, streakers, concussed players, and fighting players.

It featured the 1992 European Football Championship.

The game allowed one and two (competitive) players, playing matches of 5, 10 or 20 minutes. You could play friendly matches or the 1992 European Football Championship.

References

1992 video games
Amiga games
Association football video games
Atari ST games
DOS games
Video games developed in the United Kingdom
Video games set in Sweden